Marin Kružić (born 11 September 1989) in Rijeka) is a Croatian handball player who currently plays for RK Zamet.

Career
Kružić started his senior career in RK Kvarner Kostrena in 2004.. 

He  moved to RK Zamet in 2007. Kružić quickly established himself as a top player in Zamet.

In January 2013 got a call-up to train with the national team and to play in an upcoming against Norway. Few weeks before the match Kružić fractured his nose in training with the national team and could not play for weeks.

In 2013 when he moved to NEXE In Nexe he played in the SEHA League and in the EHF Cup. 

In 2015 Kružić moved to RK Spačva Vinkovci where he played for one season. In August 2016 it was announced that Kružić would be returning to RK Zamet. He made all six appearances in the EHF Cup in 2016 with Zamet and scored 27 goals. Zamet was knocked out in the third qualifying round by MT Melsungen

References

External links
Marin Kružić statistics 2009-present
Marin Kružić Eurohandball Profile

Croatian male handball players
RK Zamet players
RK Crikvenica players
Handball players from Rijeka
1989 births
Living people